Jonathan Finer (born 1976) is an American journalist and diplomat who serves as Deputy National Security Advisor under National Security Advisor Jake Sullivan, in the administration of U.S. President Joe Biden.  He previously served as the Chief of Staff and Director of Policy Planning for former Secretary John Kerry at the U.S. Department of State.

Early life and education
Finer is a native of Norwich, Vermont, the eldest of four children born to Susan (née Burack) and Chad Finer. His mother was the principal of the Frances C. Richmond School and his father a doctor. Finer graduated from Hanover High School in Hanover, New Hampshire. He attended Harvard University where he developed an interest in international relations after spending time working for the Labour Party in the UK. While at Harvard, he covered sports for The Harvard Crimson. He earned a Juris Doctor from Yale Law School, where he co-founded the Iraqi Refugee Assistance Project; an M.Phil. in international relations from Balliol College, Oxford, where he was a Rhodes Scholar. Finer also spent a year in Hong Kong as a Henry Luce Foundation Scholar, working as a reporter and editor at the Far Eastern Economic Review.

Career
Finer was a foreign and national correspondent at the Washington Post, where he reported from more than 20 countries and spent 18 months covering the war in Iraq, embedding with the U.S. Marines during the 2003 invasion and based in Baghdad in 2005-2006. He also covered conflicts in Gaza (2009), Russia/Georgia (2008) and Israel/Lebanon (2006); the 2004 U.S. Presidential campaign; and the 2004 Major League Baseball playoffs.

Finer joined the Obama Administration in 2009 as a White House Fellow, assigned to the Office of the White House Chief of Staff and the National Security Council Staff. At the White House, he also served as Special Advisor for the Middle East and North Africa and Foreign Policy Speechwriter for Vice President Joseph R. Biden and later as Senior Advisor to Deputy National Security Advisor Antony Blinken. 

Prior to his appointment as Chief of Staff and Director of Policy Planning at the State Department, Finer previously served as Deputy Chief of Staff for Policy.

After concluding his work with the State Department, Finer joined the New York private equity firm Warburg Pincus and served as a senior fellow for U.S. foreign policy at the Council on Foreign Relations.

References

|-

1976 births
21st-century American journalists
American diplomats
Directors of Policy Planning
Harvard University alumni
Living people
People from Norwich, Vermont
The Washington Post journalists
United States Department of State officials
United States Deputy National Security Advisors
Washington, D.C., Democrats
Yale Law School alumni